Bystrzyca may refer to:

Rivers 
Bystrzyca (Odra), a tributary of the Oder
, a tributary of the Tyśmienica
Bystrzyca Dusznicka, a tributary of the Nysa Kłodzka
Bystrzyca Łomnicka, a tributary of the Nysa Kłodzka
Bystrytsia River, a river in modern Ukraine

Towns and villages 
Bystrzyca Kłodzka, a town in Lower Silesian Voivodeship (south-west Poland)
Bystrzyca, Lwówek Śląski County in Lower Silesian Voivodeship (south-west Poland)
Bystrzyca, Oława County in Lower Silesian Voivodeship (south-west Poland)
Bystrzyca, Kuyavian-Pomeranian Voivodeship (north-central Poland)
Bystrzyca, Kraśnik County in Lublin Voivodeship (east Poland)
Bystrzyca, Lublin County in Lublin Voivodeship (east Poland)
Bystrzyca, Łuków County in Lublin Voivodeship (east Poland)
Bystrzyca, Subcarpathian Voivodeship (south-east Poland)
Bystrzyca, Gniezno County in Greater Poland Voivodeship (west-central Poland)
Bystrzyca, Konin County in Greater Poland Voivodeship (west-central Poland)
Bystrzyca Dolna
Bystrzyca Górna
Bystrzyca Nowa
Bystrzyca Stara
Bystrzyca (Polish name for Bystřice), a village in Moravian-Silesian Region

See also
Bystřice (disambiguation) for the Czech variant
Bistrica (disambiguation) for the Serbian, Croatian, Bosnian and Slovenian variant
Bistritsa (disambiguation) for the Bulgarian variant
Bistritz (disambiguation) for the German variant
Bistrița (disambiguation) for the Romanian variant
Bystrica (disambiguation) for the Slovak variant
Feistritz (disambiguation) (Germanised word)